August Zang (2 August 1807 – 4 March 1888) was an Austrian entrepreneur who founded the Viennese daily Die Presse. He also had a major influence on French baking methods.

Soldier and baker

The son of Christophe Boniface Zang, a Vienna surgeon, August Zang became an artillery officer before he went to Paris, probably in 1837, to found a bakery, Boulangerie Viennoise, which opened in 1838 or 1839. The bakery was quickly imitated, and its Austrian kipfel became the French croissant. Baking historians, who often qualify Zang as "Baron", "Count" or "Royal Chamberlain" though he did not hold those titles, sometimes claim he introduced the baguette, but that is not supported by any period source. However, he introduced the Viennese steam oven, which became standard in France.

Journalist and publisher

In 1848, when censorship was lifted in Austria, he returned to Vienna and founded Die Presse, a daily newspaper that still exists today though after several interruptions. The paper was modelled on Émile de Girardin's La Presse and introduced many of the same popularising journalistic techniques, including a low price supported by volume and advertising; serials; and short, easily-understood paragraphs. In 1864, a dispute led two key journalists to leave Die Presse to found Die Neue Freie Presse. The original Die Presse was soon known as Die Alte Presse, and Zang sold it in 1867.

Later life
In his remaining years, he owned a bank and a mine in Styria, the site of which is still known as Zangtal ("Zang Valley").

When he died, he was most known as a wealthy press magnate. His obituary in Die Presse said only that he had spent some years in Paris and omitted all mention of his role in baking.

His ornate tomb in Vienna is still a tourist attraction.

See also
Vienna bread
Viennoiserie, a French term referring to baked goods in the style of or influenced by Viennese baking

Notes

References
 Wurzbach, C. (1891). Biographisches Lexikon des Kaiserthums Oesterreich, enthaltend die Lebensskizzen der denkwürdigen Perosnen, welche seit 1750 in den österreichischen Kronländern geboren wurden oder darin gelebt und gewirkt haben, (162-165)
 Article in "Die Presse" on its founding
 Another article in "Die Presse" on its founding
 Central Cemetery Zentralfriedhof-image of Zang's tomb
 Voitsberg page mentioning Zang's castle and Zangtal
 August Zang and the French Croissant

19th-century Austrian businesspeople
Bakers
Austrian publishers (people)
Businesspeople from Vienna
1807 births
1888 deaths
19th-century newspaper publishers (people)
Austrian Empire military personnel